The 2016 Tour de France was the 103rd edition of the race, one of cycling's Grand Tours. The 21-stage race took place from 2 to 24 July 2016, starting in Mont Saint-Michel in Normandy and finishing on the Champs-Élysées in Paris. All eighteen Union Cycliste Internationale (UCI) WorldTeams were automatically invited and were obliged to attend the race. In March 2016, four UCI Professional Continental teams were given wildcard places into the race by the organiser – Amaury Sport Organisation (ASO) – to complete the 22-team peloton. As each team was entitled to enter nine riders, the peloton on the first stage consisted of 198 riders from 35 countries. France, Spain, the Netherlands, Belgium, Italy and Germany all had ten or more riders competing in the race.

The final stage in Paris was contested by 174 riders, with 24 of the riders failing to finish the race, a record low number of withdrawals. The race was won by Chris Froome, the champion from both the 2013 Tour and the 2015 Tour. Froome first took the lead of the race following the eighth stage after attacking on the descent into Bagnères-de-Luchon. He extended his lead on stages 11 and 13 before further extending his lead in the Alps to win his third Tour de France. Frenchman Romain Bardet finished second, 4 minutes and 5 seconds behind Froome, with Nairo Quintana third. Adam Yates won the competition for the best young rider. The points classification was won for the fifth consecutive year by Peter Sagan, who also won the combativity award. Rafał Majka of Poland won the mountains classification, while Movistar won the team classification. In the lists below the teams are listed in order of the race number worn by its cyclists.

Teams
The 18 UCI WorldTeams were automatically invited to participate in the Tour. Three of the teams (Cofidis, Direct Énergie and Fortuneo–Vital Concept) are French while Bora–Argon 18 is German. The 2016 Tour de France was the third consecutive Tour de France that Bora–Argon 18 and Fortuneo–Vital Concept had been invited to compete as a wildcard. After the wildcard announcement, Bora–Argon 18's team manager, Ralph Denk, said, "These are great news today! , To be invited for the third time in a row to the world's biggest cycling event is a big honour, and I want to thank the ASO for their trust in us."

UCI WorldTeams

  (riders)
  (riders)
  (riders)
  (riders)
  (riders)
  (riders)
  (riders)
  (riders)
  (riders)
  (riders)
  (riders)
  (riders)
  (riders)
  (riders)
  (riders)
  (riders)
  (riders)
  (riders)

UCI Professional Continental teams

  (riders)
  (riders)
  (riders)
  (riders)

Cyclists

By starting number
Note: As each team used numbers from 1 to 9; 11 to 19; 21 to 29 etc., there were no race numbers ending in 0. This is so all the team leaders had a race number ending in "1".

By team

By nationality
The 198 riders that competed in the 2016 Tour de France represented 35 different countries.

Notes

References

Sources

External links

2016 Tour de France
2016